Tadeusz Jarmuziewicz (born 21 September 1957 in Piława Górna) is a Polish politician. He was elected to the Sejm on 25 September 2005, getting 9635 votes in 21 Opole district as a candidate from the Civic Platform list.

He was also a member of Sejm 1997-2001 and Sejm 2001-2005.

See also
Members of Polish Sejm 2005-2007

External links
Tadeusz Jarmuziewicz - parliamentary page - includes declarations of interest, voting record, and transcripts of speeches.

Members of the Polish Sejm 2005–2007
Members of the Polish Sejm 1997–2001
Members of the Polish Sejm 2001–2005
Civic Platform politicians
1957 births
Living people
Members of the Polish Sejm 2007–2011
Members of the Polish Sejm 2011–2015